HMS Peterel was a six-gun  packet brig built for the Royal Navy during the 1830s.

Description
The ship's tonnage was 359  tons burthen. The Alert class was initially armed with a pair of 6-pounder cannon and four 12-pounder carronades. Later they were equipped with six 32-pounder or eight 18-pounder cannon. The ships had a crew of 44 officers and ratings.

Construction and career
Peterel, the third ship of her name to serve in the Royal Navy, was ordered on 14 April 1836, laid down in April 1837 at Pembroke Dockyard, Wales, and launched on 23 May 1838. She was completed on 3 October 1838 at Plymouth Dockyard and commissioned on 18 August of that year.

Notes

References

Alert-class brig
1838 ships
Ships built in Pembroke Dock